Alabama Department of Revenue v. CSX Transportation, Inc., 575 U.S. 21 (2015), was a United States Supreme Court case in which the Court held that "the Eleventh Circuit properly concluded that CSX's competitors
are an appropriate comparison class for the Railroad Revitalization and Regulation Reform Act of 1976's subsection (b)(4) claim." The Act prohibits states from imposing "another tax that discriminates against a rail carrier" and the Court found that the  Eleventh Circuit "erred in refusing to consider whether Alabama could justify its decision to exempt motor carriers from its sales and use taxes through its decision to subject motor carriers to a fuel excise tax."

Opinion of the Court 
Associate Justice Antonin Scalia authored the Court's 7–2 decision.

See also 

 List of United States Supreme Court cases
List of United States Supreme Court cases, volume 575

References

External links
 
 SCOTUSblog coverage

United States Supreme Court cases
United States Supreme Court cases of the Roberts Court
2015 in United States case law
CSX Transportation
United States taxation and revenue case law
Rail transportation in Alabama